Javad Hesari (also Romanized as Javād Ḩeşārī) is a village in Zarrineh Rud Rural District, in the Central District of Miandoab County, West Azerbaijan Province, Iran. At the 2006 census, its population was 1,407, in 283 families.

References 

Populated places in Miandoab County